Apollo is an enormous impact crater located in the southern hemisphere on the far side of the Moon. This formation dwarfs the large crater Oppenheimer that is located next to the western rim. The crater Barringer lies across the northern wall. To the southeast is the crater Anders, and Kleymenov is just to the east of the rim.

Apollo is a double-ringed walled plain (or basin) whose inner ring is roughly half the diameter of the outer wall. Both the outer wall and the interior have been heavily worn and eroded by subsequent impacts, so that significant parts of the outer and inner walls now consist of irregular and incised sections of mountainous arcs.

The interior floor is covered in a multitude of craters of various sizes, some of which have been named for people associated with the Apollo program or other NASA projects.

Sections of Apollo's interior have been resurfaced with lava, leaving patches of the floor with a lower albedo than the surroundings. There is a large patch of this lunar mare in the middle part of the inner ring, which contains some ray system markings. A long stretch of the mare lies along the southern part of the crater. There is also a smaller section near the western rim.

Prior to formal naming in 1970 by the IAU, the crater was known as Basin XVI.

Interior craters

Three craters are named after the crew of Apollo 8.  In the southeast part of Apollo is Borman crater, named after commander Frank Borman.  Near the southeastern margin of Apollo is Anders crater, named after William Anders. On the eastern margin is Lovell crater, named after Jim Lovell.

Many craters within and adjacent to the Apollo impact have been named to honor deceased NASA employees.

Dryden is attached to the west-northwestern exterior of the inner ring. Chaffee is a similar-sized crater that lies partly across the southwest section of the inner ring.  Inside the inner ring are the craters Resnik, McAuliffe and Onizuka, and the Jarvis–McNair crater pair. The crater Smith lies across the northern part of the inner ring.

In 2006 the IAU approved a proposal to name seven interior craters to honor the astronauts killed in the Space Shuttle Columbia disaster.

Three of the crater names include the respective astronaut's first initials to distinguish them from the existing craters called Anderson, Brown and Clark.

References

External links
 

Impact craters on the Moon
Apollo program